Oscar Peterson at the Stratford Shakespearean Festival is a 1956 live album by Oscar Peterson, accompanied by Ray Brown and Herb Ellis, recorded at the 1956 Stratford Shakespeare Festival in the city of Stratford, Ontario, Canada.

Track listing
 "Falling in Love with Love" (Lorenz Hart, Richard Rodgers) – 6:15
 "How About You?" (Ralph Freed, Burton Lane) – 5:53
 "Flamingo" (Edmund Anderson, Ted Grouya) – 4:59
 "Swinging on a Star" (Johnny Burke, Jimmy Van Heusen) – 5:33
 "Noreen's Nocturne" (Oscar Peterson) – 5:31
 "Gypsy in My Soul" (Clay Boland, Moe Jaffe) – 6:23
 "Nuages" (Django Reinhardt) – 5:05
 "How High the Moon" (Nancy Hamilton, Morgan Lewis) – 9:44
 "Love You Madly" (Duke Ellington) – 8:01
 "52nd Street Theme" (Thelonious Monk) – 4:13
 "Daisy's Dream" (Peterson) – 13:26

Personnel

Performance
 Oscar Peterson - piano
 Ray Brown - double bass
 Herb Ellis - guitar

References

Oscar Peterson live albums
Albums produced by Norman Granz
1956 live albums
Verve Records live albums